The 4th Annual Latin American Music Awards were held at the Dolby Theatre in Los Angeles, California. It was broadcast live on Telemundo. J Balvin and Ozuna led the nominations with nine each. The latter and boyband CNCO got the most awards with three each, and the group won all of their nominations.

Performers

Winners
The nominations were announced on September 18, 2018

 Daddy Yankee Wins "Icon Award"
 Maluma Wins "Extraordinary Evolution Award"

Multiple nominations and awards

References

External links

 Official site in Facebook
 Official site in Instagram
 Official site in Twitter

2018 music awards
2018 in Latin music
2018 in Los Angeles